The 2013–14 Iraqi Premier League was the 40th season of the competition since its establishment in 1974. The name of the league was changed from Iraqi Elite League to Iraqi Premier League, and the season began on 29 October 2013. The situation in Iraq caused by the war with ISIS began to worsen towards the end of spring 2014, with increased unrest in the country causing travel difficulties and concerns over the feasibility of scheduling the remaining fixtures, particularly with the month of Ramadan approaching.

On 18 June 2014, after the end of round 23 of 30, the Iraq Football Association (IFA) announced in an official statement that it had decided to end the league at its current stage and consider the league table as final, without relegating any teams. First-placed Al-Shorta and second-placed Erbil would not be crowned as champions and runners-up respectively, but would be considered as such only for the purpose of enabling admission into the AFC Cup.

League table

Results

Top scorers

References

External links
 Iraq Football Association

Iraqi Premier League seasons
1
Iraq